The Chronicles of Solar Pons is a collection of detective fiction short stories by author August Derleth.  It is the sixth volume in the series of Derleth's Solar Pons short stories, and was released in 1973 by Mycroft & Moran in an edition of 4,176 copies.

Contents

The Chronicles of Solar Pons contains the following tales:

 "Introduction", by Allen J. Hubin
 "The Adventure of the Red Leech"
 "The Adventure of the Orient Express" (Note: This novelette had been published as a stand-alone volume by Candlelight Press, NY, 1964 as a softcover with dustjacket). 
 "The Adventure of the Golden Bracelet"
 "The Adventure of the Shaplow Millions"
 "The Adventure of the Benin Bronze"
 "The Adventure of the Missing Tenants"
 "The Adventure of the Aluminum Crutch"
 "The Adventure of the Seven Sisters"
 "The Adventure of the Bishop's Companion"
 "The Adventure of the Unique Dickensians"

Reprints
Los Angeles: Pinnacle, 1974.

References

1973 short story collections
Mystery short story collections
Sherlock Holmes pastiches
Solar Pons